Silvinho is a Portuguese nickname for people named Sílvio, and it means "small Sílvio".

It can refer to these footballers:

 Silvinho (footballer, born 1958), Silvio Paiva, Brazilian winger
 Silvinho (footballer, born 1974), Sílvio Antônio, Brazilian striker
 Silvinho (footballer, born 1990), Sílvio José Cardoso Reis Júnior, Brazilian winger
 Silvinho Canuto (born 1977), Brazilian midfielder
 Silvinho Esajas (born 2002), Dutch defender
 Sylvinho (born 1974), Brazilian defender